Huachenglu station may refer to:
Huachenglu station (Guangzhou Metro), station of Line 9 (Guangzhou Metro)
Huachenglu station (Chongqing Rail Transit), station of Line 5 (Chongqing Rail Transit)